Redemption is a 2012 short documentary film directed by Jon Alpert and Matthew O'Neill. The film, which details the lives of New York City's "canners," people who survive by redeeming bottles and cans for money, was nominated for the 2013 Academy Award for Best Documentary (Short Subject).

After being nominated for an Academy Award, the film was released along with all the other 15 Oscar-nominated short films in theaters by ShortsHD.

See also
Carts of Darkness, a documentary film about "binners" in North Vancouver

References

External links

2012 films
2012 short documentary films
Recycling in the United States
Documentary films about New York City
American short documentary films
2010s American films